Archimedes and the Seagle (1984) is a novel by Australian writer David Ireland. It won the ALS Gold Medal in 1985.

Plot summary

The Archimedes of the title is a dog, an old red setter who has learnt to read and who philosophises about the world.  In particular, he is fascinated by seagulls, and one in particular, who appears to soar like an eagle, hence the "seagle".

Reviews

Veronica Sen in The Canberra Times noted: "An extraordinary thing about this novel is that while being defiantly a 'novel with a message' it has sufficient charm to invite reader co-operation. Somehow it's possible to go along with the ten qualities that Archimedes proposes for all living things, or his reflections on the real meaning of an open society and the spirit of Australia. If the dog sounds priggish, be not afraid. He has the capacity to love his imperfect family as well as another dog-person, Darling, whose eyes are 'untouched, can did and happy' and who bubbles and fizzes and is 'just perfect'." And she concluded: "...I was entranced by his novel's whimsical humour, its beautifully rhythmic language and its humane insights. As a recipe for living, whether by man or dog, this very personal book of hard-won knowledge could well be tried and found true."

Awards and nominations 

 1985 – winner ALS Gold Medal

References

1984 Australian novels
Novels by David Ireland
ALS Gold Medal winning works